Yanacocha (possibly from Quechua yana black, qucha lake, "black lake") is a mountain in the Vilcanota mountain range in the Andes of Peru, about  high. The mountain is located in the Puno Region, Carabaya Province, Macusani District, and the Melgar Province, Nuñoa District. Yanacocha lies south of the river Ninahuisa.

References

Mountains of Puno Region
Mountains of Peru